Nita is a monotypic genus of cellar spiders containing the single species, Nita elsaff. It was first described by B. A. Huber & H. K. El-Hennawy in 2007, and is found in Uzbekistan, Iran, and Egypt.

See also
 List of Pholcidae species

References

Pholcidae
Spiders described in 2007
Spiders of Africa
Spiders of Asia